The Pointe des Berons is a mountain of the Mont Blanc Massif, located on the border between Switzerland and France. It lies approximately halfway between the Col de Balme and the Aiguille du Tour. The east (Swiss) side is covered by the Glacier des Berons.

References

External links
 Pointe des Berons on Hikr

Mountains of the Alps
Mountains of Valais
Mountains of Haute-Savoie
France–Switzerland border
International mountains of Europe
Mountains of Switzerland
Two-thousanders of Switzerland
Mont Blanc massif